Korn is an American nu metal band from Bakersfield, California. Formed in 1993, the band originally featured vocalist Jonathan Davis, guitarists James "Munky" Shaffer and Brian "Head" Welch, bassist Reginald "Fieldy" Arvizu, and drummer David Silveria. The current lineup of the group includes drummer Ray Luzier, who replaced Silveria in 2009. The band released its self-titled debut album Korn in 1994, which was produced by Ross Robinson and featured equal songwriting credits for the whole band. Life Is Peachy, released in 1996, included two cover versions – of Ice Cube's "Wicked" and War's "Lowrider", while the band's third album Follow the Leader featured collaborations with Limp Bizkit's Fred Durst ("All in the Family") and rappers Ice Cube ("Children of the Korn") and Slimkid3 ("Cameltosis").

Following the release of Korn's next three albums – 1999's Issues, 2002's Untouchables and 2003's Take a Look in the Mirror – all of which featured equal songwriting credits for all five band members, Welch left the group in 2005 due to his "newfound Christian faith". The previous year, the band had released Greatest Hits Vol. 1, which featured recordings of Cameo's "Word Up!" and Pink Floyd's "Another Brick in the Wall". Korn returned as a quartet in 2005 with See You on the Other Side, which co-credited producers The Matrix and Atticus Ross on many tracks. After Silveria left in 2007, Brooks Wackerman and Terry Bozzio performed drums on the band's 2007 untitled eighth studio album, which also featured keyboardist Zac Baird who was credited for songwriting on many of the album's songs.

After filling in for the departed Silveria on the untitled album's touring cycle, Ray Luzier joined as Korn's full-time drummer in 2009, first contributing to the band's 2010 album Korn III: Remember Who You Are, which returned to crediting the band for songwriting. The band's next album, 2011's The Path of Totality, saw a drastic shift in musical style into electronic music, particularly dubstep, including collaborations with Skrillex, Noisia, Excision and more. Original guitarist Brian "Head" Welch rejoined the band in 2013, returning for The Paradigm Shift which co-credited producer Don Gilmore for songwriting. The Serenity of Suffering followed in 2016.

Songs

Footnotes

References

External links
List of Korn songs at AllMusic
List of Korn songs at MusicBrainz

Korn